The 2013 Tevlin Women's Challenger was a professional tennis tournament played on indoor hard courts. It was the 9th edition of the tournament and part of the 2013 ITF Women's Circuit, offering a total of $50,000 in prize money. It took place in Toronto, Ontario, Canada between October 28 and November 3, 2013.

Singles main-draw entrants

Seeds

1 Rankings are as of October 21, 2013

Other entrants
The following players received wildcards into the singles main draw:
 Françoise Abanda
 Élisabeth Fournier
 Marie-Alexandre Leduc
 Gloria Liang

The following players received entry from the qualifying draw:
 Macall Harkins
 Petra Januskova
 Tori Kinard
 Jillian O'Neill

The following players received entry as lucky losers:
 Lena Litvak
 Sonja Molnar

Champions

Singles

 Victoria Duval def.  Tímea Babos, 7–5, retired

Doubles

 Françoise Abanda /  Victoria Duval def.  Melanie Oudin /  Jessica Pegula, 7–6(7–5), 2–6, [11–9]

External links
Official website

Tevlin Women's Challenger
Tevlin Women's Challenger
Tevlin Women's Challenger
Tevlin Women's Challenger
Tevlin Women's Challenger